Yulia Vladimirovna Timoshinina (born 23 January 1998) is a Russian diver.

Timoshinina competed at the 2015 World Aquatics Championships, and the 2016 Olympic Games.

Family
Timoshinina was born to diver Vladimir and Svetlana.

See also
Russia at the 2015 World Aquatics Championships

References

External links
 
 
 

Russian female divers
Living people
Divers from Moscow
1998 births
Divers at the 2016 Summer Olympics
Olympic divers of Russia
Universiade medalists in diving
Universiade silver medalists for Russia
Universiade bronze medalists for Russia
World Aquatics Championships medalists in diving
European Games competitors for Russia
Divers at the 2015 European Games
Medalists at the 2017 Summer Universiade
Divers at the 2020 Summer Olympics
21st-century Russian women